Ángel García Hernández (born 1 September 2000) is a Mexican professional footballer who plays as a midfielder for Liga de Expansión MX club Pumas Tabasco, on loan from UNAM.

Career statistics

Club

References

External links
 

2000 births
Living people
Mexican footballers
Association football midfielders
Club Universidad Nacional footballers